Bihanga is a settlement in Ibanda District, Uganda.

Bihanga may also refer to:
 Bihanga Military Training School, Bihanga, Uganda - see List of military schools in Uganda
 Bihanga Island, Barguna District, Bangladesh
 Bihanga, a 1999 film by Abdullah al Mamun
 Bihanga, the inflight magazine of Biman Bangladesh Airlines

See also
 Bihangal, a village in Barishal Division, Bangladesh